Wall Around a Star is a science fiction novel by American writers Frederik Pohl and Jack Williamson, the second book of the Saga of Cuckoo series, following Farthest Star.  The book was published by Del Rey Books on January 12, 1983, with cover art by David Mattingly.

In this novel linguist Jen Babylon is called on to translate alien records which may explain the nature of "Cuckoo", a sphere built around a star, and thus save the galaxy.

References 

1983 American novels
1983 science fiction novels
Collaborative novels
Novels by Frederik Pohl
Novels by Jack Williamson
Del Rey books
Books with cover art by David Burroughs Mattingly